Essam al-Buwaydhani was a Syrian rebel leader. He was reportedly born in Douma and was a businessman by profession. He was elected leader of Jaysh al-Islam after Zahran Alloush, the previous leader of the group, was killed in a Syrian Air Force air strike in December 2015.

References

1971 births
Syrian Salafis
People of the Syrian civil war
People from Rif Dimashq Governorate
Syrian businesspeople
2019 deaths